Jim Jidhed (born February 23, 1963), sometimes known as Jim Willy Jidhed, is a Swedish rock singer. Jidhed's first major break was as the lead singer for the rock band Alien in the late 1980s with the ballad "Only One Woman". After that he released his first solo album called Jim, which included the cover songs "Wild Young And Free", "Silence is Golden", "Don't Lose Any Sleep" and "Love Hurts". Jidhed participated in Melodifestivalen in 1991 with "Kommer du ihåg mig?", finishing 3rd, and in 1997 where he performed "Charlie", finishing 10th.

In 2003, Jidhed released an album entitled Full Circle. In 2007 he released "Reflektioner", his first Swedish language album in 16 years. During 2008 Jidhed re-released the album "Jim" through the MTM label. As a songwriter on Tove Jaarnek's album "Sound of Romance" he reached the Svensktoppen with the song "I’ve Been Touched by You".

Discography

Solo albums

Studio albums

with Glamour
Jag Vill Dansa, Natten Är Ung (1982)

with Alien
Alien (1988)
Dark Eyes (2005)
Eternity (2014)
Into the Future (2020)

Singles
"Only One Woman" (1988)
"Go Easy" (1988)
"Wild Young and Free" (1990)
"Snart Kommer Natten" (1991)
"Kommer du ihåg mig?" (1991)
"Charlie" (1997)
"För Alltid" (2006)
"Du är min värld" (2007)
"Det känns som förra sommaren" (2007)

Independent singles
"Woman Is the Hunter" (1988)
"Love Spins" (1991)
"Blue, Blue, Blue Village" (1997)
"Blåvitt, blåvitt" (1997)
"The Rose" (1998)

Reviews
review of Full Circle at Melodic.net
review of Full Circle at RockUnited.com
review of Full Circle by Alberto Bertamino

References

External links

1963 births
Living people
Swedish rock singers
Swedish pop singers
Swedish male singers
Swedish Christians
Melodifestivalen contestants of 1997
Melodifestivalen contestants of 1991